Capital Springs State Recreation Area is a state park unit of Wisconsin, United States, in development just south of Madison. The park was authorized in 2000, the centennial of the Wisconsin state park system. The park includes  of undeveloped shoreline on Lake Waubesa. The recreation area incorporates existing Dane County parks, and the site will be jointly managed by the state and the county.

The property includes Native American archaeological sites that were listed on the National Register of Historic Places in 1978 as Lake Farms Archaeological District. In this area near Lake Waubesa, Early Woodland people lived seasonally, leaving behind remains of fish, mammals, waterfowl, nuts, and pottery fragments.

Activities and amenities
Trails: The park offers  of hiking trails and a  section of the Capital City State Trail. Trails are groomed for cross-country skiing in winter.
Boating, canoeing, and fishing are offered on Lake Waubesa. Picnic grounds are near the lake shore.

References

External links
Capital Springs State Recreation Area
Friends of Capital Springs State Recreation Area

Archaeological sites on the National Register of Historic Places in Wisconsin
Protected areas established in 2000
Protected areas of Dane County, Wisconsin
State parks of Wisconsin
National Register of Historic Places in Dane County, Wisconsin
2000 establishments in Wisconsin